The Central District of Masal County is a district (bakhsh) in Masal County, Gilan Province, Iran. At the 2006 census, its population was 26,063, in 6,886 families.  The District has one city: Masal. The District has two rural districts (dehestan): Howmeh Rural District and Masal Rural District.

References 

Masal County
Districts of Gilan Province